Ramona Thieme Mercer (born October 4, 1929) is the author of a mid-range nursing theory known as maternal role attainment. Mercer has contributed many works to the refinement of this theory and is credited as a nurse-theorist. She was the Nahm Lecturer 1984 at the University of California.

Career 
Mercer earned a diploma from St. Margaret’s School of Nursing in Montgomery, Alabama. She earned an undergraduate degree in nursing with distinction from the University of New Mexico in 1962, followed by a master's degree in maternal child nursing from Emory University in 1964. For ten years, she worked as a staff nurse, head nurse and instructor. She was a faculty member at Emory University for five years until she left to pursue doctoral studies in maternity nursing at the University of Pittsburgh.

Honors and awards 
1988: Distinguished Research Lectureship Award, Western Society for Research in Nursing (inaugural award)
2003: Living Legend, American Academy of Nursing
2004: Distinguished Alumni Award, University of New Mexico College of Nursing

Works

See also

List of Living Legends of the American Academy of Nursing

References

Living people
American health and wellness writers
Nursing theorists
University of New Mexico alumni
Emory University alumni
University of Pittsburgh alumni
University of California, Berkeley people
1929 births